Morgex is a town and comune in the Aosta Valley region of north-western Italy. High quality white wine is produced in the area, and it is home to the last few plantings of the very rare pink grape, Roussin de Morgex.

References

Cities and towns in Aosta Valley